Abu Bakar Bah (born October 10, 1978) is a Sierra Leonean former professional footballer who last played for Lampung FC in the Liga Indonesia Premier Division as a midfielder.

Honours

Club honors
Al Ahed
Lebanese FA Cup (2): 2003–04, 2004–05
Lebanese Federation Cup (2): 2004, 2006

References

External links

Association football midfielders
Sierra Leonean expatriate footballers
Sierra Leonean expatriate sportspeople in Indonesia
Sierra Leonean footballers
Expatriate footballers in Indonesia
1978 births
Living people
Al Ahed FC players
Racing Club Beirut players
Lebanese Premier League players
Sierra Leonean expatriate sportspeople in Lebanon
Expatriate footballers in Lebanon
Sierra Leone international footballers
People from Kenema